KRVS (88.7 FM) is a radio station broadcasting a public radio format. Licensed to Lafayette, Louisiana, United States, it is currently owned by the University of Louisiana at Lafayette and features programming from American Public Media, National Public Radio and Public Radio International.

Programming covers various types of music of Louisiana such as Cajun music, zydeco, blues, jazz, swamp pop, swamp rock and other Louisiana singer/songwriter music. KRVS also broadcasts the annual Festival International de Louisiane. The station also carries news and music programming in Louisiana French.

History
The station began broadcasting in May 1963 and was officially licensed on August 8, 1963, to operate a power of 10 watts and a coverage area of about six city blocks.

KRVS's call letters stand for Radio Voice of Southwestern (The university's name at the time the station signed on was the University of Southwestern Louisiana). Originally a college radio station, it joined NPR in the mid-1970s.

Today the station serves roles as regional public radio and an international online resource. KRVS broadcasts at 100,000 watts, providing service to 651,000 residents in 12 parishes across southern Louisiana, an area referred to as Acadiana. KRVS programs are also available on the Internet.

KRVS operated a translator at 90.5 FM K213AZ in Lake Charles that was licensed on February 6, 1989. It was shut down on May 22, 2001 after American Family Radio opened a full-power station, KYLC, at nearby 90.3 FM. FCC rules allow a full-power station to force any adjacent translators to shut down. In 2003, KRVS moved its transmitter 30 miles to the west to extend its signal to Lake Charles.

Medicine Ball Caravan 

Medicine Ball Caravan airs every Monday through Thursday mornings at 11 am (CST) with repeat broadcasts each following morning at 2 am. Produced and hosted by the station's Music Director, Cecil Doyle, the show features a wide array of musical styles that feature not only local Louisiana sounds but also classic and contemporary recordings, with occasional live in-studio interviews and performances.

References

External links

Radio stations established in 1963
University of Louisiana at Lafayette
College radio stations in Louisiana
RVS
NPR member stations
1963 establishments in Louisiana